China Everbright Water Limited is a Bermuda incorporated company that specialized in wastewater treatment in the mainland China. The shares of the company float in Singapore Exchange.

References

External links
 

Waste management companies of China
Offshore companies of Bermuda
Companies listed on the Singapore Exchange
Companies based in Shenzhen
China Everbright Group
Waste companies established in 2014
Chinese companies established in 2014